This is an alphabetical list of Protestant Reformers.

A
 Johannes Aepinus
 Johann Agricola Eisleben
 Ludwig Agricola
 Mikael Agricola
 Stephan Agricola
 Erasmus Alber
 Matthäus Alber
 Alexander Alesius
 Symphorian Altbießer
 Andreas Althamer
 Menso Alting
 Johannes Amandi
 Nikolaus von Amsdorf
 Jakob Andreae
 Laurentius Andreae
 Georg Aportanus
 Caspar Aquila
 Benedictus Aretius
 James Arminius
 Jan Augusta
 Johannes Aurifaber (Vimariensis)
 Johannes Aurifaber (Vratislaviensis)

B
 Johannes Bader
 Bartholomäus Bernhardi
 Louis de Berquin
 Jacob Beurlin
 Christian Beyer
 Hartmann Beyer
 Johann Bernhard
 Théodore de Bèze
 Theodor Bibliander
 Theobald Billicanus
 Ambrosius Blarer
 Andreas Bodenstein
 Hermann Bonnus
 Anne Boleyn
 Caspar Borner
 Martin Borrhaus
 Johannes Brenz
 Guido de Bres
 Johann Briesmann
 Gregor Brück
 Leonhard Brunner
 Martin Bucer
 George Buchanan
 Georg Buchholzer
 Johannes Bugenhagen
 Heinrich Bullinger
 Johannes Bünderlin
 Benedikt Burgauer
 Adrian Buxschott

C
 Michael Caelius
 John Calvin
 Wolfgang Capito
 Andreas Cellarius (theologian)
 Michael Cellarius
 Martin Chemnitz
 David Chyträus
 Adolf Clarenbach
 John Colet
 Johannes Comander
 Konrad Cordatus
 Anton Corvinus
 Thomas Cranmer
 Thomas Cromwell
 Caspar Cruciger der Jüngere
 Caspar Cruciger der Ältere
 Abraham Culvensis
 Alexander Cunningham
 Valentin Curtius

E
 Paul Eber
 Johann Eberlin von Günzburg
 Johannes Sylvius Egranus
 Paul von Eitzen
 Christian Entfelder
 Francisco de Enzinas
 Matthias Erb

F
 Theodor Fabricius
 Paul Fagius
 Guillaume Farel
 Matthias Flacius
 Johann Forster
 Martin Frecht
 Sebastian Fröschel
 Johannes Frosch

G
 Philipp Gallicius
 Nicolaus Gallus
 Thomas Gassner
 Johannes Garcreus
 Gerard Geldenhouwer
 Johannes Gigas
 Johann Glandrop
 Nikolaus Glossenus
 Kaspar Gräter
 Johannes Gramann
 Daniel Greser
 Argula von Grumbach
 Simon Grynaeus
 Augustin Gschmus
 Rudolf Gualther
 Caspar Güttel

H
 Richard Hooker
 François Hotman
 Balthasar Hubmaier

I
 Hartmann Ibach
 Christoph Irenäus
 Franz Irenicus
 Johann Isenmann, also Johann Isenmenger

J
 Matthias von Jagow
 Justus Jonas der Ältere
 George Joye
 Leo Jud
 Matthäus Judex
 Franciscus Junius (the elder), also Franz Junius or François du Jon

K
 Leonhard Kaiser, also Leonhard Käser, Leonhard Kaysser
 Kaspar Kantz
 Georg Parsimonius, also Karg
 Stefan Kempe
 Johann Kessler, also Johann Keßler
 Heinrich von Kettenbach
 Thomas Kirchmeyer
 Timotheus Kirchner
 Jacob Knade
 Johannes Knipstro
 Andreas Knöpken
 John Knox
 Franz Kolb (theologian)
 Adam Krafft 1493-1558
 Nikolaus Krage
 Gottschalk Kruse
 Abraomas Kulvietis 
 Johannes Kymaeus

L
 Johann Lachmann
 Franz Lambert von Avignon
 Johann(es) Lang(e), a Thuringian reformator
 Johannes Langer
 Hubert Languet
 Johannes á Lasco
 Hugh Latimer
 Anton Lauterbach
 Johannes Lening
 Johannes Lingarius, also Johannes Bender
 Konrad Limmer
 Wenzeslaus Linck
 Johann Lindemann (theologian), see also Johann Lindemann (Theologe)
 Kaspar Löner
 Johannes Lonicer
 Johann Lüdecke, also Johann Ludecus
 Martin Luther
 Johannes Lycaula

M
 Martynas Mažvydas
 Georg Major
 Johann Mantel
 Johannes Marbacher
 Johannes Matthesius
 Hermann Marsow
 Nikolaus Medler
 Kapar Megander
 Philipp Melanchthon
 Dionysius Melander
 Justus Menius
 Angelus Merula, also Engel von Merlen
 Michael Meurer, also Michael Haenlein, Michael a Muris Galliculus
 Sebastian Meyer
 Joachim Mörlin
 Maximilian Mörlin
 Ambrosius Moibanus, also Andreas Moyben
 Jacob Montanus
 Antonius Musa, also Andreas West, Andreas Wilsch
 Simon Musaeus, also Simon Meusel
 Andreas Musculus, also Andreas Meusel
 Wolfgang Musculus
 Friedrich Myconius
 Oswald Myconius

N
 Hieronymus Nopp, also Hieronymus Noppius
 Brictius thom Norde, also Nordanus

O
 Bernardino Ochino
 Johannes Oekolampad, aka Oecolampadius
 Georg Oemler, also Aemelius
 Konrad Öttinger
 Kaspar Olevianus
 Gerd Omeken 
 Andreas Osiander
 Jacob Other, also Jacob Otter

P
 Peder Palladius
 Johannes Pappus
 Matthew Parker
 Konrad Pelikan
 Laurentius Petri
 Olaus Petri
 Caspar Peucer
 Johann Pfeffinger
 Paul Phrygio, also Paul Sidensticker, Paul Kostentzer
 Johann Pistoris, also Becker, Niddanus
 Tilemann Plettener, also Tilemann Platner
 Andreas Poach
 Georg von Polentz, also Georg von Polenz
 Johann Pollius, also Johann Polhen, Johann Polhenne
 Abdias Prätorius
 Stephan Prätorius
 Jacobus Probst
 Nikolaus Prugener

Q
 Erhard von Queiß

R
 Ludwig Rabus
 Balthasar Raid, also Balthasar Reith
 Stanislaus Rapagelanus
 Urbanus Rhegius
 Stephan Riccius
 Johann Reibling
 Bartholomaeus Rieseberg
 Erasmus Ritter
 Paul vom Rode
 Patroklus Römeling
 Georg Rörer
 Bartholomäus Rosinus
 Jacob Runge
 Johann Rurer
 Ranjeeth Ophir

S
 Heinrich Salmuth
 Konrad Sam
 Erasmus Sarcerius
 Martin Schalling the Elder
 Martin Schalling the Younger
 Christoph Schappeler
 Georg Scharnekau
 Jacob Schenck
 Johann Schlaginhaufen, also Johann Schlainhauffen, Johann Turbicida
 Johann Schnabel
 Tilemann Schnabel
 Simon Schneeweiß
 Erhard Schnepf
 Johannes Schradin
 Gervasius Schuler
 Theobald Schwarz, also Theobald Nigri, Theobald Niger
 Kaspar Schwenckfeld
 Abraham Scultetus
 Jan Seklycian
 Nikolaus Selnecker
 Dominicus Sleupner, also Dominicus Schleupner
 Joachim Slüter, also Jochim Slyter, Jochim Dutzo
 Georg Spalatin
 Cyriakus Spangenberg
 Johann Spangenberg
 Paul Speratus
 Johann Stammel
 Michael Stiefel
 Johann Stössel
 Johannes Spreter
 Johann Stoltz
 Jacob Stratner
 Jacob Strauß
 Victorinus Strigel
 Bartholomaeus Suawe
 Simon Sulzer
 Johann Sutel

T
 Hans Tausen
 Sylvester Tegetmeier
 Johann Timann
 Primož Trubar 
 Hermann Tulich
 William Tyndale

U
 Johann Konrad Ulmer also Johann Konrad de Ulma
 Zacharias Ursinus

V
 Juan de Valdés
 Thomas Venatorius
 Georg von Venediger
 Pier Paolo Vergerio
 Pietro Martire Vermigli, also Peter Martyr
 Pierre Viret

W
 Burkhard Waldis
 Joachim von Watt
 Adam Weiß
 Michael Weiße
 Hieronymus Weller
 Johann Westermann (theologian)
 Joachim Westphal
 Johann Wigand
 Heinrich Winkel, also Heinrich Winckel
 George Wishart
 Bonifatius Wolfart
 John Wycliffe
 Thomas Wyttenbach

Z
 Girolamo Zanchi
 Katharina Zell, also Katharina Schütz
 Matthäus Zell
 Heinrich von Zütphen
 Johannes Zwick
 Gabriel Zwilling 
 Huldrych Zwingli

Reformers